Charaxes plantroui, the pink-washed demon charaxes, is a butterfly in the family Nymphalidae. It is found in eastern Guinea, Sierra Leone, northern and central Ivory Coast, Ghana and Nigeria. The habitat consists of drier forests and dense Guinea savanna. It is locally common in its habitat.

The larvae feed on Albizia zygia, Albizia adianthifolia, Afzelia africana, Griffonia simplicifolia, Andira inermis and Dalbergia saxatilis.

References

External links
Images of C. plantroui  Royal Museum for Central Africa (Albertine Rift Project)
Charaxes plantroui images at Consortium for the Barcode of Life includes paratype
Charaxes plantroui f. simonae images at BOLD
Charaxes plantroui guioi images at BOLD guioi?

Butterflies described in 1975
plantroui